Dartmouth High School is a four-year public high school located in Dartmouth, Massachusetts, United States.

As of the 201920 school year, the school had an enrollment of 1,039 students and 73.4 classroom teachers (on an FTE basis), for a student-teacher ratio of 14.1 to 1.

History 
The school began in 1902 on Russell's Mills Road in what is now the Salt-Marsh Pottery. By the 1930s the school had moved to a building on Slocum Road (referred to as the Elmer Poole School), which is now used as the town hall. In 1955 a new school was built next door, on the corner of Hawthorne Street, with the building being expanded twice, in 1965 and 1981. In 2003, the school was moved to its new location at the end of Bakerville Road, at the junction of Russells Mills Road, on the former farmland of the King family, with the former high school now being used as the middle school.

In 1993 during a social studies class a student was stabbed to death by classmates who barged into the classroom armed with baseball bats, billy clubs and knives. Three students aged 15 and 16 were charged with first degree murder of Jason Robinson.

Music Department 
The music department at Dartmouth High School has a long history of successes and is nationally well renowned. The music department includes the marching band, concert band, and jazz band, as well as the orchestra, chamber orchestra, chorus, and a cappella group Harmonix. It also includes the Winter color guard program and the Winter percussion program.

Marching Band 

 † = These scores are from the USBands Virtual Grand Finale.
The band is under the direction of Ian Flint (has been under the direction of William Kingsland up until the 2020 school year) and has been a Division 5 winner of NESBA Championships in 2003, 2004, 2007, 2008, 2010, 2011, 2014, 2015, 2016, 2017, 2018, 2021, 2022 and Division 6 in 2019. In 2004, 2007, 2008, 2009, 2010, 2011, 2013, 2016, 2017, 2018, 2019, 2021, and 2022; the band has won first place at USBands (formerly USSBA) National Championships in Annapolis, Maryland (2008–2011) and East Rutherford, New Jersey (2012–present). The band also began competing in Bands of America circuits in 2022 by winning the New Jersey Regional Championship with an 83.600. Additionally, they have many other titles in NESBA, where the marching band holds the highest score in NESBA history, 99.6, received in 2018 with the field show entitled "The Rainforest”. They also held the previous records of 99.1 scored in both 2014 and 2017. In USBands they tied the highest score of 98.575 that was set in 2008. The Band also holds many titles at MICCA, and formerly in EMBA. The group has also performed at the 1996 Tournament of Roses Parade, as well as several other festivals and Magic Music Days at the Walt Disney World Resort. The band and percussion performed their own shows virtually in 2020.

Winter Percussion 

 † = The group did not attend WGI World Championships and only attended NESBA Finals.
 ‡ = The group did not attend WGI World Championships or NESBA Finals.
The Dartmouth High Winter Percussion performs in Winter Guard International where they consistently placed in the top 3 from 1998 to 2013. Today, they compete in Scholastic World Class at Winter Guard International championships held in Dayton, Ohio. The group won WGI Percussion Scholastic World Championships in 1998, 1999, 2008, 2009, and 2014, with 2nd-place finishes in 2000, 2006, 2007, 2011, 2012, and 2018 and 3rd-place finishes in 2001, 2002, 2004, 2005, 2010, 2015, and 2022. In Winter Guard International world class competitions, they have consistently won fan favorite. They have also held the record for the highest scoring group in the Percussion Scholastic World division for 15+ years. The group did not attend NESBA Finals or WGI World Championships in 2020 because of the global COVID-19 pandemic. The group was able to perform in virtual WGI competitions in 2021, however.

Winter Guard 

 † = The group did not attend WGI Championships or NESBA Finals.
The Dartmouth High School Winter Guard competed in the Scholastic A Class of WGI where they made WGI Finals three times – in 2014, 2016, and 2017. After their 2nd-place finish in 2017 the group moved into the Scholastic Open Class where they received 13th place in their debut season in the division in 2018.  The Winter Guard has been awarded the "Fan Favorite" award in 2016, 2017, and 2019. The Winter Guard did not attend NESBA Finals or WGI Championships in 2020 because of the global pandemic.

Winter Winds 

The Dartmouth High School Indoor winds program was established in 2021-2022 under the direction of Ian Flint and Michael Rayner. The winds made WGI finals and placed 2nd during their first year despite facing early complications and a complete show redesign due to copyright issues.

Orchestra 
The high school's orchestra has also traveled to many places national as well as international places such as Ireland, the Azores, Canada, Austria and Germany, and New York. They traveled to Ireland again in April 2014, which included playing for the mayor, and getting critiqued by music professors there. On December 16, 2016, the high school performed a tribute concert to the Trans-Siberian Orchestra, featuring both students and guest musicians on electric violin, cello, guitar, along with a drummer and a keyboardist., and hosted another Trans-Siberian Orchestra tribute concert at the Zeiterion Performing Arts Center in New Bedford the next year. The orchestra also traveled to Scotland in July 2018.

Athletics

Football accomplishments

State Champions – 1983, 1984, 2014, 2015
State Finalists – 1977, 1982, 1991, 1995, 2007
League Champions – 1977, 1982, 1983, 1984, 1991, 1995, 2006, 2007, 2008, 2016

Notable alumni 

Beverly Morrison Glennon – author, teacher, and historian
Jordan Todman – former NFL running back for the San Diego Chargers, Minnesota Vikings, Jacksonville Jaguars, Carolina Panthers, Pittsburgh Steelers, Indianapolis Colts, New York Jets, and Houston Texans, played running back for University of Connecticut
Arthur Lynch – former NFL tight end for the Miami Dolphins, New York Jets, Denver Broncos, and Atlanta Falcons, played tight end for the University of Georgia
Brian Rose – former MLB player for the Boston Red Sox, Colorado Rockies, New York Mets, and Tampa Bay Rays
Pete Souza – former Chief Official White House Photographer (2009-2017)
Huda Kattan – makeup mogul
Lewis Millett – United States Medal of Honor recipient

References

External links

 Dartmouth High School

Schools in Bristol County, Massachusetts
Dartmouth, Massachusetts
Public high schools in Massachusetts
1902 establishments in Massachusetts